Has-Been Heroes is an action video game developed by Frozenbyte and published by GameTrust. The game was released on 28 March 2017 in North America and in Europe and Australia on 4 April 2017 on Nintendo Switch, PlayStation 4, Microsoft Windows, and Xbox One. This game is Gamestop exclusive and was only sold through Gamestop stores at launch.

Gameplay
Has-Been Heroes is an action, strategy video game with roguelike elements. The game features a mixture of turn-based strategy and real-time strategy mechanics.

Release
Has-Been Heroes is being developed by Frozenbyte and published by GameTrust. The game was announced in January 2017. It launched on Nintendo Switch, PlayStation 4, Microsoft Windows, and Xbox One on 28 March 2017.

Reception

Has-Been Heroes received "mixed or average reviews" from professional critics according to review aggregator website Metacritic. While the game received praise for its combat system, criticism was directed at its repetitive gameplay and high difficulty level.

References

External links
 

Action video games
Frozenbyte games
Nintendo Switch games
PlayStation 4 games
Roguelike video games
Strategy video games
2017 video games
Video games developed in Finland
Windows games
Xbox One games